National Tertiary Route 929, or just Route 929 (or ) is a National Road Route of Costa Rica, located in the Guanacaste province. It is a road in the Nicoya Peninsula, it starts at Route 906 and ends at Puerto Humo, on the shores of Tempisque river.

Description
Currently a gravel road, this is a small road that connects Route 150 through Route 906 to the Tempisque river. The route visits the towns of Pozo de Agua, Puerto Humo and the Tempisque river.
In Guanacaste province the route covers Nicoya canton (San Antonio district).

History
In late 2019 a pilot program with a new and cheaper asphalt paving procedure, using recycled materials, was put in place with initial tests over this gravel road.

References

Highways in Costa Rica